The third USS Osceola (YT-129), previously USS YT-129, later YTB-129, later YTM-129, was a United States Navy harbor tug commissioned in 1938 and sold for scrapping in 1973.

Harbor tug USS YT-129 was launched by the Charleston Navy Yard on 3 March 1938 and commissioned on 1 June 1938. She was assigned the name USS Osceola (YT-129) on 17 September 1938.

Osceola reported to the 14th Naval District, headquartered at Pearl Harbor, Hawaii and was stationed at Pearl Harbor throughout World War II. She was reclassified as a large harbor tug (YTB–129) on 12 April 1944 and was damaged during the West Loch Disaster of 21 May 1944. Her classification changed to medium harbor tug (YTM–129) in early 1962.

Osceola was sold for scrapping by the Defense Reutilization and Marketing Service (DRMS) on 1 February 1973.

References

External links
MaritimeDigital Encyclopedia
NavSource Online: Service Ship Photo Archive Osceola (YTM-129) ex Osceola (YTB-129) (1944 - 1962) Osceola (YT-129) (1938 - 1944)

Tugs of the United States Navy
Ships built in Charleston, South Carolina
1938 ships
Ships present during the attack on Pearl Harbor
World War II auxiliary ships of the United States